Piney Township is an inactive township in Pulaski County, in the U.S. state of Missouri.

Piney Township was erected in 1853, taking its name from the Big Piney River.

References

Townships in Missouri
Townships in Pulaski County, Missouri